Diary of a Wimpy Kid: Big Shot is the sixteenth book in the Diary of a Wimpy Kid series by Jeff Kinney. It was released on October 26, 2021. The story follows Greg Heffley as he reluctantly signs up for basketball. It received generally positive reviews and was a best-seller for several weeks following its release.

Plot 
The book begins with Greg reminiscing about his past experience with sports and why he quit them. Upon learning about a Field Day at school, where the winning homeroom gets a day off, he begins to train for the day. He attempts to go the gym with his father Frank, but they are both kicked out due to Greg making too much noise.

Field Day turns out to be a large disaster, as teachers trade students to give them an advantage, students are paid to fail in the game, and ultimately, the lunch staff wins the day. Due to the custodial staff having to take care of lunch, the principal is forced to give everyone the day off. Greg is sluggish after the catastrophe, but Greg's mom Susan encourages him to give sports one more try, as he reluctantly signs up for basketball.

He performs terribly at tryouts, but he manages to make it onto a team, with coach Mr. Patel. He had got his son Preet, who is incredibly skilled at the sport onto the team as well (Preet had to miss tryouts due to his uncle's funeral, so Mr. Patel created a team with the kids who were cut from tryouts so his son could play). The team has difficulties practicing, and their court is rented out by another club.

The team plays at another school, in which they are beaten by a large margin, and Mr. Patel and the team, including Greg, are discouraged to play again. Susan decides to reorganize the team, and give them a new name, the Huskies, as she becomes the coach, but uses strange techniques for practicing.

She introduces them to the Second Chance Tournament, a state-wide tournament you cannot leave until you win. The Huskies is unable to win a single game until there are only two teams, where they realize one team will not be able to win, making it the worst in the state. The game is rough, with the opposing team, the Funky Dunkers also being terrible in play. In the middle of the game, Mr. Patel arrives with Preet, who is given the chance to play in the game with one leg, which he happily accepts.

One of the Funky Dunkers' members sprains his leg, putting them at a disadvantage. They initially decide to forfeit, but Susan wants the game to be fair for everyone, and she trades Greg to the other team. Greg quickly realizes that she traded him because he was dragging the team down, but at the last second, he accidentally makes a half-court 3-pointer, letting him and the other Funky Dunkers win. This secures them as the second-worst team in the state, and the original Huskies as the worst team in the state.

Development 

Big Shot was first teased by Jeff Kinney in April of 2020 through Twitter. In a response to a fan letter, he confirmed that he was writing both a fifteenth and sixteenth book. The title and cover were later revealed on May 27, 2021.

The cover of Big Shot depicts Greg with mismatched equipment from multiple different sports. According to Kinney, this was a design choice to communicate that the story was about sports in general, rather than only basketball. After the release of the book, Kinney said it took him several weeks to write the first sentence of the book.

References

2021 American novels
2021 children's books
American children's novels
Diary of a Wimpy Kid
Novels by Jeff Kinney
American young adult novels
American sports novels
Amulet Books books